The Citation of Constitutional Laws Act, 2005 (Act No. 5 of 2005) is an act of the Parliament of South Africa which altered the way in which the Constitution and its amendments are numbered and referred to.

An ordinary act of Parliament is referred to by the year in which it is passed and an identifying number within that year; the identifying number is allocated by the Presidency when the act is signed by the President. The Constitution was originally numbered as "Act No. 108 of 1996". Various jurists, including Chief Justice Arthur Chaskalson, expressed the opinion that the Constitution should not be treated as an ordinary act of Parliament, because it was enacted by the Constitutional Assembly rather than by Parliament and because it was supreme over all other law. The Citation of Constitutional Laws Act put this suggestion into effect, removing the Constitution's act number and determining that it was to be referred to only by its title, "Constitution of the Republic of South Africa, 1996".

The act also dealt similarly with the eleven (at the time) acts amending the constitution. They had originally been given titles of the form "Constitution of the Republic of South Africa [Second] Amendment Act, [year]" and act numbers in the ordinary sequence. The Citation Act removed their act numbers, and retitled them in a single chronological sequence. The following table makes it clear:

It also decreed that subsequent constitutional amendment acts should be named similarly.

References

External links

Official copy of the act

Constitution of South Africa
South African legislation
2005 in South African law